Ralston Malcolm Otto (born 26 December 1957) played cricket as a batsman for the Leeward Islands in the 1980s, and has subsequently coached and managed the team. He managed the Antigua and Barbuda team that competed in the 2008 Stanford 20/20 tournament.

Otto is a cousin of former West Indies fast bowler Curtly Ambrose.

References

External links

1957 births
Living people
Antigua and Barbuda cricketers
Leeward Islands cricketers